David Wynn Williams  (1949–9 December 2017) was a British archaeologist.

Career
Williams initially attended the Reigate School of Art, Design and Media and used his experience in graphic design to work as an archaeological illustrator, including drawing Native American and South American artefacts for the Museum of Mankind. He was a long-time member of the Surrey Archaeological Society (SAS) and the Weald and Downland Metal Detecting Club and took part in numerous excavations throughout Britain and Europe, including at the Roman temple complex at Wanborough, Surrey and Betchworth.

He was elected as a Fellow of the Society of Antiquaries of London in April 1998.

Williams took up the role of Find Liaison Officer for Surrey with the Portable Antiquities Scheme in 2003 (latterly also for East Berkshire). He stayed in this role until he died unexpectedly at home on 9 December 2017. A memorial conference was held in his honour by the Surrey Archaeological Society on 9 February 2019.

Select publications

References

1949 births
2017 deaths
Fellows of the Society of Antiquaries of London
British archaeologists
21st-century archaeologists
20th-century archaeologists
People associated with the Portable Antiquities Scheme